"Boy You Knock Me Out" is a song by American actress and singer Tatyana Ali from her only studio album, Kiss the Sky (1998). Written by Kelly Price, StoneBridge, and Nick Nice, the track samples "Summer Madness" by Kool & the Gang and "What You Won't Do for Love" by Bobby Caldwell. Released via MJJ Music and Epic Records on February 1, 1999, the song reached number three on the UK Singles Chart and entered the top 40 of the charts in France, Iceland, Ireland, and New Zealand. The single version of the song, known as the "Big Willie Style" edit, features Will Smith performing a rap.

Background
Tatyana Ali was recruited by her co-star on The Fresh Prince of Bel-Air, Will Smith, to launch her own music career, and she postponed attending Harvard University so she could record Kiss the Sky. "Boy You Knock Me Out" was written by Kelly Price, Nick Nice, and StoneBridge, who also produced the song. The track samples elements from Kool & the Gang's 1974 instrumental "Summer Madness"—written by the band, Alton Taylor, and Robert Mickens—and interpolates Bobby Caldwell's 1978 song "What You Won't Do for Love"—written by Caldwell and Alfons Kettner. Ali recorded the track at StoneBridge Productions in Stockholm, Sweden, and at Titan Recording Studio in Sherman Oaks, Los Angeles. Smith performs a rap verse on the "Big Willie Style" single version.

Release and reception
Although MJJ Music and Work Group serviced "Boy You Knock Me Out" to US radio in October 1998, it did not chart on the Billboard Hot 100 like its predecessor, "Daydreamin'". The single did appear on the Billboard Hot R&B Singles and Rhythmic charts, stalling at numbers 68 and 40, respectively, in January 1999. On February 1, 1999, the single was released in the United Kingdom and became Ali's highest-charting song, debuting and peaking at number three on the UK Singles Chart six days after its release. In Ireland, the single reached number 19. The song entered the top 10 in Iceland, peaking at number six in March 1999. That same month, the single peaked at number 12 in New Zealand and number 32 in France. "Boy You Knock Me Out" was certified gold in New Zealand (5,000 sales) and silver in the UK (200,000 shipments).

Track listings

UK CD1
 "Boy You Knock Me Out" (Big Willie Style single edit) – 4:00
 "Boy You Knock Me Out" (Master Urban remix) – 4:08
 "Love the Way You Love Me" – 5:02
 "Boy You Knock Me Out" (video)

UK CD2
 "Boy You Knock Me Out" (Big Willie Style extended single) – 4:21
 "Boy You Knock Me Out" (Maurice's Xclusive club mix) – 9:00
 "Boy You Knock Me Out" (Stone's extended version) – 5:20

UK cassette single
 "Boy You Knock Me Out" (Big Willie Style single edit) – 4:00
 "Love the Way You Love Me" – 5:02
 "Boy You Knock Me Out" (Master Urban remix) – 4:08

European CD1
 "Boy You Knock Me Out" (Big Willie Style single edit) – 4:00
 "Boy You Knock Me Out" (Maurice's radio mix) – 4:00

European CD2
 "Boy You Knock Me Out" (Big Willie Style single edit) – 4:00
 "Boy You Knock Me Out" (Maurice's radio mix) – 4:00
 "Boy You Knock Me Out" (Maurice's Xclusive club mix) – 9:00
 "Boy You Knock Me Out" (Maurice's Xclusive instrumental) – 9:00
 "Boy You Knock Me Out" (video)

Australian CD single
 "Boy You Knock Me Out" (single edit)
 "Boy You Knock Me Out" (Master Urban remix)
 "Boy You Knock Me Out" (Maurice's radio mix)
 "Boy You Knock Me Out" (Maurice's Xclusive club mix)

Credits and personnel
Credits are taken from the Kiss the Sky album booklet.

Studios
 Recorded at StoneBridge Productions (Stockholm, Sweden) and Titan Recording Studio (Sherman Oaks, Los Angeles)
 Mixed at Enterprise II Studio (Burbank, California)

Personnel

 Kelly Price – writing, background vocals, vocal production and arrangement
 StoneBridge – writing, production, vocal production and arrangement, engineering
 Nick Nice – writing
 Alfons Kettner – writing ("What You Won't Do for Love")
 Bobby Caldwell – writing ("What You Won't Do for Love")
 Alton Taylor – writing ("Summer Madness")
 Robert Mickens – writing ("Summer Madness")
 Robert "Kool" Bell – writing ("Summer Madness")

 Dennis Thomas – writing ("Summer Madness")
 Richard Westfield – writing ("Summer Madness")
 George Brown – writing ("Summer Madness")
 Claydes Charles Smith – writing ("Summer Madness")
 Tatyana Ali – lead vocals, background vocals
 Will Smith – rap (Big Willie Style version)
 Rob Chiarelli – additional programming, mixing
 Michael Blum – engineering

Charts

Certifications

Release history

References

1998 songs
1999 singles
Epic Records singles
Songs written by Bobby Caldwell
Songs written by Claydes Charles Smith
Songs written by Kelly Price
Songs written by Robert "Kool" Bell
Tatyana Ali songs
Will Smith songs